Elliot E. Cohen  (March 14, 1899 – May 28, 1959) was the founder and first editor of Commentary.

Background

While an undergraduate at Yale, Cohen contributed light verse to a campus humor magazine, The Yale Record.

Career

Menorah Journal

In the 1930s, he was a co-editor of the Menorah Journal with Herbert Solow.

Commentary

Cohen was founder-editor of Commentary, published by the American Jewish Committee (no longer affiliated) from 1945 until his death by suicide in 1959.

During his tenure at Commentary, the magazine had a liberal point of view. His editorial position was filled by Norman Podhoretz in 1960, by Neal Kozodoy in 1995, and by John Podhoretz in 2009.

References

Further reading
 Strauss, Lauren B. "Staying afloat in the Melting Pot: Constructing an American Jewish identity in the Menorah Journal of the 1920s." American Jewish History 84.4 (1996): 315-331.
 Wald, Alan M. The New York intellectuals: the rise and decline of the anti-stalinist left from the 1930s to the 1980s (U North Carolina Press, 2017).

External links
 Commentary website
 New York Sun article on who attends the annual Commentary-hosted gathering
 More bio bits on Cohen and Commentary history
 Nathan Abrams, Commentary Magazine 1945-1959:  'A Journal of Significant Thought and Opinion. Bio on Cohen and Commentary's early history

American magazine editors
Jewish American writers
Editors of religious publications
1959 deaths
1899 births
Suicides in New York City
Writers from Des Moines, Iowa
The Yale Record alumni
1959 suicides
20th-century American Jews
American Jewish Committee